Pia Adelsteen (born 11 September 1963 in Korsør) is a Danish politician, who was a member of the Folketing from 2007 to 2019. She was first elected into parliament at the 2007 Danish general election.

Political career
Adelsteen was a member of the municipal councils of Slangerup Municipality from 2002 to 2006, Frederikssund Municipality from 2006 to 2014 and Mariagerfjord Municipality since 2018. She was elected into parliament at the 2007 election was reelected in 2011 and 2015. She didn't run for reelection in the 2019 election, instead choosing to run in the 2019 European Parliament election, though not managing to get elected.

References

External links 

 Biography on the website of the Danish Parliament (Folketinget)

1963 births
Living people
People from Korsør
Danish People's Party politicians
Danish municipal councillors
21st-century Danish women politicians
Women members of the Folketing
Members of the Folketing 2007–2011
Members of the Folketing 2011–2015
Members of the Folketing 2015–2019